Harvey Heights may refer to several places:

 Harvey Heights (Tampa), a neighborhood within the City of Tampa, Florida, United States
 Harvey Heights (Antarctica), a place on the continent of Antarctica